Dominique Guidi (born 6 February 1996) is a French professional footballer who as a centre-back for Ligue 2 club Bastia.

Career
On 1 June 2018, Guidi signed a two-year contract with Gazélec Ajaccio. He made his professional debut for Gazélec Ajaccio in a 1–1 Ligue 2 tie with Paris FC on 27 July 2018. He scored his first goal in Ligue 2 against Red Star on 31 August 2018, offering victory to his team.

In May 2020, SC Bastia, newly promoted to the Championnat National, announced Guidi as their first signing for the 2020–21 season. He agreed a two-year contract with the club.

References

External links
 
 
 

1998 births
Living people
People from Porto-Vecchio
French footballers
Footballers from Corsica
Association football defenders
Gazélec Ajaccio players
SC Bastia players
Ligue 2 players
Championnat National players
Championnat National 2 players
Championnat National 3 players
Sportspeople from Corse-du-Sud